

The AISA GN was a prototype four-seat autogyro developed in Spain between 1971 and 1982. it featured an extensively-glazed cabin fitted with a pusher engine and tricycle undercarriage. A separate tail fin was carried at the end of two booms mounted to stub wings. The prototype was developed with a 200 hp engine. The aircraft suffered from an extremely prolonged development, but finally took to the air on 20 July 1982. Shortly thereafter, however, it was damaged and finally abandoned.

Specifications (performance estimated)

References

 
 
 

1980s Spanish civil utility aircraft
Single-engined pusher autogyros
GN
Aircraft first flown in 1982